Maple Ridge Secondary is a public high school in Maple Ridge, British Columbia, Canada, part of School District 42 Maple Ridge-Pitt Meadows.

Academics 
Maple Ridge Secondary offers academic courses as part of the Advanced Placement (AP) program, although only the English Language & Composition and English Literature & Composition courses have been taught. It was ranked 201st in the Fraser Institute annual ranking of schools in 2004/05. MRSS also offers an Outreach program for students from throughout the district who have fallen behind in their schooling.

Athletics 
MRSS sports teams include badminton, basketball, soccer, wrestling, mountain biking, cheerleading, field hockey, swimming, rugby, cross country, track and field, volleyball, water polo, tennis, golf, field lacrosse, and ball hockey.

Arts
MRSS is known within its school district and the province of British Columbia for its Digital Art Academy, which offers students classes in the digital arts. These include creating:
 Art with Photoshop
 Websites
 Sound effects and music
 Short films
 Poster art and cartoon-art with Illustrator and Photoshop
 Programming games using Adobe Director and Flash. MRSS is the only school in School District 42 to offer a certificate of membership to a Digital Art Academy.

In popular culture
Much of the music video for Likey, by K-pop girl group Twice, was filmed on the school's campus in 2017.

Notable alumni
Robert Mundell, 1949.
Tyler Labine, actor 1996.
Karina LeBlanc, Member of the Canadian Women's Olympic Soccer Team 2008 and 2012.
Andrew Ladd, NHL player 2003.
Larry Walker, MLB 5x All Star, 1997 National League MVP
Brandon Yip, NHL player 2003.
Maggie Coles-Lyster, 2017, Pan Am Games Cyclist
Jeff Curwen, 1987, Canadian National Bronze Medallist, Major Juvenile Baseball, Coquitlam Reds

References

External links
 MRSS website

School Reports - Ministry of Education
 Class size
 Satisfaction survey
 School performance
 Skills assessment

High schools in British Columbia
Maple Ridge, British Columbia
Educational institutions in Canada with year of establishment missing